Héctor Rojo Carrasco (born 9 September 1981), commonly known as Pacheta, is a Spanish professional footballer who plays for CF Sant Rafel as a striker.

Football career
Born in Salas de los Infantes, Province of Burgos, Castile and León, Pacheta made his senior debuts with local CP Salas de los Infantes, in the 1998–99 season. He first arrived in the Segunda División B in 2000, signing with CD Calahorra.

A year later, Pacheta signed with CD Numancia, being initially assigned to the reserves in the Tercera División. On 6 February 2002 he first appeared for the main squad, playing the entire second half of a 1–1 home draw against Xerez CD, in the Segunda División. In the following two seasons he remained in the third level, representing CD Logroñés, CA Osasuna B and Burgos CF.

After being released by Burgos, Pacheta spent six seasons in the Tercera División, representing Norma San Leonardo, Fundación Logroñés, Oviedo, Los Barrios and Tudelano. He only returned to the third level in July 2011, signing with Arandina CF. A year later he returned to Burgos, in the fourth level.

References

External links

1981 births
Living people
Spanish footballers
Footballers from Castile and León
Association football forwards
Segunda División players
Segunda División B players
Tercera División players
CD Numancia B players
CD Numancia players
CD Logroñés footballers
CA Osasuna B players
Burgos CF footballers
Real Oviedo players
UD Los Barrios footballers
CD Tudelano footballers
Arandina CF players